The Wu family style t'ai chi ch'uan (Taijiquan) of Wu Quanyou and Wu Chien-ch'uan (Wu Jianquan) is the second most popular form of t'ai chi ch'uan in the world today, after the Yang style, and fourth in terms of family seniority. This style is different from the Wu style of t'ai chi ch'uan (武氏) founded by Wu Yu-hsiang. While the names are distinct in pronunciation and the Chinese characters used to write them are different, they are often romanized the same way.

History
Wu Quanyou was a military officer cadet of Manchu ancestry in the Yellow Banner camp (see Qing Dynasty Military) in the Forbidden City, Beijing and also a hereditary officer of the Imperial Guards Brigade. At that time, Yang Luchan was the martial arts instructor in the Imperial Guards, teaching t'ai chi ch'uan, and in 1850 Wu Ch'uan-yu became one of his students.

In 1870, Wu Ch'uan-yu was asked to become the senior disciple of Yang Pan-hou, Yang Luchan's oldest adult son, and an instructor as well to the Manchu military.
Wu Ch'uan-yu had three primary disciples: his son Wu Chien-ch'uan, Wang Mao Zhai and Guo Fen.

Wu Ch'uan-yu's son, Wu Chien-ch'uan, and grandchildren: grandsons Wu Kung-i and Wu Kung-tsao as well as granddaughter Wu Ying-hua were well known teachers.

Wu Chien-ch'uan became the most widely known teacher in his family, and is therefore considered the co-founder of the Wu style by his family and their students. He taught large numbers of people and his refinements to the art more clearly distinguish Wu style from Yang style training.

Wu Chien-ch'uan moved his family south from Beijing (where an important school founded by other students of his father is headquartered, popularly known as the Northern Wu style) to Shanghai in 1928, where he founded the Chien-ch'uan T'ai Chi Ch'uan Association (鑑泉太極拳社) in 1935.

Wu Kung-i then moved the family headquarters to Hong Kong in 1948. 
His younger sister Wu Ying-hua and her husband, Ma Yueh-liang (Ma Yueliang, 馬岳樑, 1901-1999), stayed behind to manage the original Shanghai school. 
Between 1983 and her death in 1996 Wu Ying-hua was the highest-ranked instructor in the Wu family system. Her descendants continue teaching and today manage the Shanghai school as well as schools in Europe:
 Ma Hai Long is the current head of the Shanghai Jianquan Taijiquan Association.
 Ma Jiang Bao (1941-2016) lived in the Netherlands and taught traditional taijiquan throughout Europe.
 Her granddaughter Dr Jin Ye lives and teaches in England. 
 Her adopted daughter Shi Mei Lin now lives and teaches Wu-style taijiquan in New Zealand, with students also in France and The United States.

Wu Kung-i's children were also full-time martial art teachers:
 His son Wu Ta-k'uei was active in the resistance to the Japanese invasion of China, yet he later taught t'ai chi ch'uan in Japan after the war.
 His younger brother, Wu Ta-ch'i, supervised the family's Hong Kong and southeast Asian schools for many years and opened the family's first western hemisphere school in Toronto, Canada in 1974.
 His daughter, Wu Yen-hsia, was known as an expert with the t'ai chi chien (sword).
 His cousin, Wu Ta-hsin, was also known as a weapons specialist, particularly with the t'ai chi tao (sabre).

T'ai chi ch'uan lineage tree with Wu-style focus

Training
The Wu style's distinctive hand form, pushing hands and weapons trainings emphasize parallel footwork and horse stance training with the feet relatively closer together than the modern Yang or Chen styles, small circle hand techniques (although large circle techniques are trained as well) and differs from the other t'ai chi family styles martially with Wu style's initial focus on grappling, throws (shuai chiao), tumbling, jumping, footsweeps, pressure point leverage and joint locks and breaks, which are trained in addition to more conventional t'ai chi sparring and fencing at advanced levels.

Generational senior instructors of the Wu family t'ai chi ch'uan schools
1st Generation
Wu Ch'uan-yu (Quanyou, 吳全佑, 1834-1902), who learned from Yang Luchan and Yang Pan-hou, was senior instructor of the family from 1870–1902.

2nd generation
His oldest son, Wu Chien-ch'uan (Wu Jianquan, 吳鑑泉, 1870-1942), was senior from 1902–1942.

3rd Generation
His oldest son, Wu Kung-i (Wu Gongyi, 吳公儀, 1900-1970) was senior from 1942–1970.
Wu Kung-i's younger brother, Wu Kung-tsao (Wu Gongzao, 吳公藻, 1903-1983), was senior from 1970–1983.
Wu Kung-i's younger sister, Wu Ying-hua (Wu Yinghua, 吳英華, 1907-1997), was senior from 1983–1997.

4th Generation
Wu Kung-i's daughter, Wu Yan-hsia (Wu Yanxia, 吳雁霞, 1930-2001) was senior from 1997–2001.
Wu Kung-tsao's son, Wu Ta-hsin (Wu Daxin, 吳大新, 1933-2005), was senior from 2001–2005.

5th Generation
The current senior instructor of the Wu family is Wu Ta-kuei's son Wu Kuang-yu (Wu Guangyu, Eddie Wu, 吳光宇, born 1946).

See also
 108 form Wu family T'ai Chi Ch'uan
 Wu Style Tai Chi Fast Form
 List of t'ai chi ch'uan forms
 Silk reeling
 Wudang t'ai chi ch'uan

References

 Tina Chunna Zhang, Frank Allen (2006). Classical Northern Wu Style Tai Ji Quan. Blue Snake Books.

External links

 http://www.wustyle.com/ International Wu Style Tai Chi Chuan Federation website 
 Taijiquan and the search for the little old Chinese man 2003 by Adam Dean Frank, Dissertation, The University of Texas at Austin, University of Texas Digital Repository

Tai chi styles
Neijia